The lateral plantar nerve (external plantar nerve) is a branch of the tibial nerve, in turn a branch of the sciatic nerve and supplies the skin of the fifth toe and lateral half of the fourth, as well as most of the deep muscles, its distribution being similar to that of the ulnar nerve in the hand.

It passes obliquely forward with the lateral plantar artery to the lateral side of the foot, lying between the flexor digitorum brevis and quadratus plantae and, in the interval between the flexor muscle and the abductor digiti minimi, divides into a superficial and a deep branch. Before its division, it supplies the quadratus plantae and abductor digiti minimi. It divides into deep and superficial branches.

Additional images

References

External links

Nerves of the lower limb and lower torso